Many Japanese martial arts feature an  as part of their exercise outfit. Such an obi is often made of thick cotton and is about 5 cm wide. The martial arts obi are most often worn in the koma-musubi knot (square knot); in practice where a hakama is worn, the obi is tied in other ways.

In many martial arts, the colour of the obi signifies the wearer's skill level. Usually the colours start from white for beginners and end in black or red-and-white for masters.

Aikido
Unlike in many other martial arts, adult practitioners of aikido do not traditionally wear coloured obis, though in some schools different colour codes have been formed, especially for children. The children's obis range from white for beginner level to 7th kyū, other colours for the rest of the kyū levels, and black for levels 1st dan and up.

In some aikido schools, wearing a hakama is a privilege earned by reaching the first dan level. In other schools, all practitioners may wear a hakama. After taking up using a hakama, the colour of obi does not matter since it will be covered by the hakama.

Example of colour range in aikido
Below is a typical example of obi colours per level in aikido:

However, aikido schools worldwide may use their own systems with little reference to other schools save the use of a black belt for at least some dan grades.

Bujinkan Budō Taijutsu 

Ninjutsu

Ninja obi are required within JNF and WNF.

Atarashii naginata 

The outfit used for Atarashii naginata practice includes a hakama that covers the obi. The obi is always white; its colour has no significance beyond simply blending in with the white keikogi worn when practicing the art.

Iaido
The outfit worn to iaido practise includes a hakama, which is worn over the top of the obi, which fastens the keikogi. The obi colour has no meaning in iaido, and is usually chosen to blend in with the kimono or hakama worn by the practitioner.

Jōdō 
The outfit used for jōdō practise includes a hakama that covers the obi. The colour of the obi has no significance.

Judo

Below are the colours of obis worn for judo practise. Junior practitioners have a different colour range. There are also other colour ranges used worldwide.

Ju-Jitsu
The colours for obis used for Ju-Jitsu practise range as follows:

Different Ju-Jitsu federations use different colours. An alternative is shown below.

Jūkendō 
The outfit used for Jūkendō practise includes a hakama that covers the obi. The colour of the obi has no significance.

Karate

Kyokushin 
For adults, an obi worn in Kyokushin karate signifies rank as follows:

Stripes on non-black obis can be either black or the next obi's color. Some brown obis sport white stripes. On a black obi, gold is the most seen stripe color. Note that some dojo's in Kyokushin use a more elaborate striping system for children, allowing for a higher frequency of exams. Some higher degree blackbelts prefer to wear a plain black obi, with no markings.

Wadō-ryū
The obis used in the wadō-ryū style range in colour as follows:

Shotokan
The obis used in the shotokan KUGB style range in colour as follows:

Shitō-ryū
The obis used in the Shitō-ryū style range in colour as follows:

Kendo
The outfit used for kendo practise includes a hakama that covers the kendogi. An obi is optional; if worn, its colour has no significance.

Kyūdō
The outfit used for kyūdō practise includes a hakama that covers the obi. The colour of the obi has no significance.

T'ai Chi Ch'uan 

The outfit used for T'ai Chi is either loose-fitting, comfortable clothing or the same kind of uniform as other Chinese martial arts. Some schools also include a coloured sash, but no standard for their order has been established.

See also
 Cummerbund belt
 Kung Fu (Ranking)

References

Notes 

Keikogi